To "make one's bones" is an American English idiom meaning to take actions to establish achievement, status, or respect. It is an idiomatic equivalent of  "establish[ing] one's bona fides". 

Although the idiom appears to have originated in the United States criminal underworld, it has since migrated to more popular and less sinister usage; such as discussions of various professions and occupations including law enforcement personnel, the legal profession, and journalists.

In popular culture
The idiom was popularized in the 1969 book The Godfather and its 1972 movie adaptation, for instance when Sonny says "I 'made my bones' when I was nineteen, the last time the family had a war", and when Moe Greene says "I'm Moe Greene! I made my bones when you were going out with cheerleaders!" The term was also used in The Sopranos several times. As in these examples, in organized-crime usage the phrase refers to establishing one's credibility by killing someone.

References

American slang